British Railway Modelling (BRM) is a monthly British magazine about model railways published by Warners Group Publications plc. It has been in publication since 1993, originally under the tagline "A Colourful New Look at Hobby". The magazine has been based in Bourne, Lincolnshire, since its inception.

History

The magazine was launched with the April 1993 issue and the first editor was David Brown, an experienced journalist with a passion for model railways. Initially the use of colour throughout the magazine was a key selling point when many other magazines were predominantly printed in black and white. The magazine covered areas traditionally covered by the established model railway press, such as layouts, weathering, kit building and scratch building.

From the outset, the magazine featured minority scales and standards. The premier issue had an EM gauge layout on its cover and by its fourth issue featured a 2mm Finescale on the cover, Helsby, Tumill & Haddon, very much a minor scale. Other minority and finer scale standards were featured from the outset too. The magazine also had many well known, within the hobby, featuring from its early issues such as Jack Ray, first chairman of the Gauge O Guild and owner of the well known Crewchester garden railway, and David Jenkinson.

There was a definite lean towards high quality modelling and prototype information within BRM but it has also covered the collectable end of the hobby too. For instance BRM featured for many years The Chronicle of Lock's Siding, written by the Reverend Alan Cliff and was the longest running continuous monthly series by a freelance writer in the history of the world's model railway press. 

John Emerson followed David Brown as editor, Brown remaining as Managing Editor for a number of years. After Emerson stepped down after many years, Ben Jones took over but left as editor in early 2017 to join the model railway manufacturer, Heljan. He was succeeded by Andy McVittie but for the March 2017 edition, RMweb editor Andy York took over the editorial page, with Phil Parker taking the spot for the Spring 2017 issue. Staff writers include Parker, Smith and Tony Wright. In the present era, BRM lacks an actual editor but instead is run by an editorial team. 

Following the departure of Emerson, the magazine changed direction with more how-to articles featuring step by step guides much liked competitor Model Rail, whilst not aiming for the standards set out in the Brown era, do actively encourage people to make their own models. Despite this drop in standards, BRM does still occasionally feature finescale modelling, such as the Uckfield Model Railway Club's Leysdown in P4.

The Brown era is often considered the 'golden age' of BRM.

The magazine is published every four weeks, with new volumes commencing with the April edition.

RMweb

RMweb was started by Andy York,  evolving as a private website forum over a number of years. Funding initially was by means of donation drives, especially needed when the site became very popular and busy, increasing the costs. York started the forum, with the support of his partner John, while he was unemployed which allowed him to give a lot of time to the project following the breakup of his Right Said Fred tribute act.

The site was sold to Warner's publications by Andy York, for an undisclosed sum, and it has remained a part of their portfolio since.

BRM has close links with Warner's owned internet forum RMweb, with content appearing in both print and on the website - the October 2014 issue was an RMweb themed edition. The current RMweb editor is Andy York.

RMweb enjoys close links with many manufactures including, Kernow Model Centre, Bachmann and DJ Models, who had their own area of the forum that was used regularly by DJ Models' Dave Jones to address members and announce new releases  and also an exclusive version DJ Models' 00 gauge J94 model. Back in 2014 Hornby Hobbies''' Sales & Brand Director, Nathaniel Southworth, has taken part in a 'Q&A' session with RMweb's Andy York which provided members a chance to pose questions about Hornby and its products.

RMweb celebrated its 10th birthday on 15 March 2015. Lincolnshire Life magazine, March 2015

With the purchase of other magazines by Warner's publications (Garden Rail, Narrow Gauge Railways and Model Engineering), the RMweb forum was restructured to allow these to use it as their discussion forum.

A number of layouts and projects first started on RMweb have gone on to be featured in BRM.

On 26 April 2020, RMweb held a virtual Members Day 2020 in aid of NHS Charities Together.

 Model Railway Exhibitions 
 
The magazine has also put on its own exhibitions  throughout the country - venues have included Doncaster, Harrogate, Peterborough and The London Festival of Railway Modelling at Alexandra Palace. The latter is in association with The Model Railway Club  which is the oldest model railway society in the world, having been formed in 1910, demonstrating BRM's place within the hobby.

BRM's first show was The Festival Of Railway Modelling at Doncaster Racecourse in 1997. The first show drew on the many layouts which had featured in BRM since 1993.

As well as BRM's own shows, RMweb hosted its own show at the Ricoh Stadium'' in Coventry 2014 and it was intended for this to be the first of an annual RMweb show, however on 14 December 2014, Andy York announced that they would not "be holding a comparable event during 2015 at the same venue" as there were insufficient visitor numbers.

References

External links 
 British Railway Modelling
 RMweb Forum

Monthly magazines published in the United Kingdom
Magazines established in 1993
Rail transport modelling publications
Mass media in Lincolnshire